Wolverhampton Wanderers Football Club is a professional association football club based in Wolverhampton, West Midlands. Founded in 1877 as St. Luke's, they adopted their current name in August 1879. Wolves began playing league football in 1888 when they were nominated to become one of the twelve founder members of the Football League. Wolves remained in the Football League for 115 years in different divisions, in this time the club were English football champions for three seasons. In 2003 they were promoted into the Premier League, which had replaced the Football League's First Division at the top of the English football league system in 1992. The team were relegated back into the Football League after one season in the Premier League. Their second promotion to the Premier League came in 2009 and this spell spanned three seasons. Between 2012 and 2018 the club were playing in the Football League until their third promotion to the Premier League at the end of the 2017–18 EFL Championship season. In the current 2021–22 season, Wolves are playing at the top level of the domestic professional game for a fifth consecutive season, and their ninth at this level since the formation of the Premier League in 1992. 

Wolverhampton Wanderers played their inaugural league fixture as part of the 1888–89 Football League on 8 September 1888 against Aston Villa. Since that game they have faced 112 different sides in league football with their most regular opponent having been West Bromwich Albion, against whom they have played on 148 occasions since their first meeting on 15 December 1888. They met their most recent different league opponent, Burton Albion, for the first time in the 2016–17 Football League Championship season. The club has won 63 of their 130 league matches against Burnley, which represents the most Wolves have won against any club. Wolves has drawn more matches with West Brom than with any other club; out of the 148 league matches between the two teams, 41 have finished without a winner. The side has lost more league games to Everton than to any other club, having been defeated by them 60 times in 131 encounters.

Key
 The table includes results of matches played by Wolverhampton Wanderers in the English Football League and the Premier League. Wartime matches are regarded as unofficial and are excluded.
 For the sake of simplicity, present-day names are used throughout: for example, results against Small Heath, Woolwich Arsenal and The Wednesday are integrated into the records against Birmingham City, Arsenal and Sheffield Wednesday, respectively
   Teams with this background and symbol in the "Club" column are competing in the 2022–23 Premier League alongside Wolves.
   Clubs with this background and symbol in the "Club" column are defunct
 P = matches played; W = matches won; D = matches drawn; L = matches lost; F = goals for; A = goals against; Win% = percentage of total matches won
 The columns headed "First" and "Last" contain the first and most recent seasons in which Wolves played league matches against each opponent

All-time league record
Statistics correct as of matches played on 4 March 2023.

Notes

References
General

 
 
 

Specific

League records by opponent
English football club league records by opponent